is a Japanese politician of the Liberal Democratic Party, a member of the House of Representatives in the Diet (national legislature). A native of Torahime, Shiga and graduate of Ryukoku University, he ran unsuccessfully for the assembly of Shiga Prefecture. He was elected to the House of Representatives for the first time in 2005, and represents the 2nd District of Shiga prefecture.

References 
 

1950 births
Living people
People from Shiga Prefecture
Koizumi Children
Members of the House of Representatives (Japan)
Liberal Democratic Party (Japan) politicians